Diki Tsering (– 12 January 1981) was a 20th-century Tibetan woman, known as the mother of three reincarnated Rinpoches/Lamas: Lhamo Thondup, Tenzin Gyatso, the 14th reincarnated Dalai Lama; Thubten Jigme Norbu, the 6th reincarnated Taktser Rinpoche; and Tendzin Choegyal, the 16th reincarnated Ngari Rinpoche. In article The Discourse of Lama, Qianlong Emperor condemned families with multiple reincarnated Rinpoches/Lamas.

In Diki's biography Dalai Lama, My Son: A Mother's Story, after the murder of Reting Rinpoche in 1947 she mentioned that word started to spread that Lhamo Dhondup was not the real Dalai Lama, since Golden Urn was not used in the selection process. To put this rumor to rest for the regent Taktra and the Kashag, it was decided to use a lot-drawing process by placing both names in a vessel before the image of Je Rinpoche to confirm the real 14th Dalai Lama. This was done three times. Name Lhamo Dhondup leaped out three times, and the regent Taktra and the Kashag had nothing more to say for themselves."

Tibet expert, professor Shen Kaiyun (沈开运) of Tibet University clarified that Diki Tsering's husband Choekyong Tsering (Chinese:祁却才让) died in 1947, shortly after, Reting Rinpoche also died in 1947, both were poisoned by separatists.

References

1901 births
1981 deaths
14th Dalai Lama
People from Ping'an